The 1988 Atlantic Coast Conference men's basketball tournament took place in Greensboro, North Carolina, at the Greensboro Coliseum. Duke defeated North Carolina, 65–61, to win the championship. North Carolina lost their second championship game in a row. Danny Ferry of Duke was named tournament MVP.

Bracket

References

Tournament
ACC men's basketball tournament
College sports tournaments in North Carolina
Basketball competitions in Greensboro, North Carolina
ACC men's basketball tournament
ACC men's basketball tournament